Nicholas John Christiani (born July 17, 1987) is an American former Major League Baseball (MLB) pitcher who played for the Cincinnati Reds in 2013 and 2014.

Amateur career
Christiani is originally from Linden, New Jersey and attended Seton Hall Prep before moving onto Vanderbilt University where he would play for the Commodores. In 2007, he played collegiate summer baseball with the Orleans Cardinals of the Cape Cod Baseball League, and returned to the league in 2008 to play for the Brewster Whitecaps.

Professional career
Christiani began his career with the Reds in the 2010 season. After spending 2010, 2011, 2012, and the beginning of 2013 in the minors, Christiani was called up to the majors for the first time on August 22, 2013. Christiani was designated for assignment on August 2, 2014. He was outrighted on August 6, and stayed in the Reds minor league system until he was released on June 21, 2017.

References

External links

Vanderbilt Commodores bio

1987 births
Living people
People from Linden, New Jersey
Sportspeople from Union County, New Jersey
Baseball players from New Jersey
Cincinnati Reds players
Vanderbilt Commodores baseball players
Brewster Whitecaps players
Orleans Firebirds players
Dayton Dragons players
Lynchburg Hillcats players
Carolina Mudcats players
Louisville Bats players
Phoenix Desert Dogs players
Major League Baseball pitchers
Seton Hall Preparatory School alumni
Pensacola Blue Wahoos players